Kor Panich (Thai: ก.พานิช) is a Thai sweet shop in Bangkok, Thailand. Opened in 1932 in a shophouse on Tanao Road, the bakery is renowned for its sticky rice desserts, including mango sticky rice. The restaurant uses sticky rice from Chiang Rai, and Nam Dok Mai and Ok Rong mangoes.

References 

Buildings and structures in Bangkok